The Jalal Al-e Ahmad Literary Award is an Iranian literary award presented yearly since 2008. Every year, an award is given to the best Iranian authors on the birthday of the renowned Persian writer Jalal Al-e Ahmad. The top winner receives 110 Bahar Azadi gold coins (about $33,000), making it Iran's most lucrative literary award. In some years there is no top winner, other notables receive up to 25 gold coins. Categories include "Novel", "Short story", "Literary criticism" and "History and documentations". The award was confirmed by the Supreme Cultural Revolution Council in 2005, the first award was presented in 2008.

Winners

2021

 Top winner: (no winner)
 Short story: (no winner)
 Honorable mentions: “Unhappy Hour” by Mohammad-Esmaeil Hajalian and “Mad Saint” by Ahmadreza Amiri-Samani
 Novel: (no winner)
 Honorable mentions: “Without Father’s Name” by Seyyed Meisam Musavian and “Sad Moon, Red Moon” by Reza Julai 
 Literary criticism: (no winner)
 Honorable mention: “Albert Camus in Iran” co-written by Mohammadreza Farsian and Fatemeh Qaderi
 Documentation and historiography: 
 (joint winner) Meisam Amiri, “Fascinating Grief” 
 (joint winner) Hedayatollah Behbudi, “A Man Named Reza Who Was Then Called Reza Khan”,

2008
For works published in 2005-2006.
Top winner: (no winner)
Short story: "Killing Dragons", Yusef Alikhani
Novel: The Rule of the Game, Firuz Zanuzi Jalali
Literary criticism: The Mirror’s Rite, "Hossein-Ali Qobadi"
Documentation and historiography: The National Council of Resistance of Iran (NCRI) from Existence to Extinction, by the Political Studies and Research Institute.

2009
Top winner: (no winner)
Novel: Paytakht Hall, Mohammad-Ali Gudni, and Namira ('Immortal'), Sadegh Karamyar (co-winners)
Literary criticism: Language of Mysticism, Alireza Fuladi, and Theater of Myths, Naghmeh Samini (co-winners)
Documentation and historiography: One Woman's War: Da (Mother), Seyyedeh Azam Hosseini

2010
Top winner: (no winner)

2011
Top winner: The War Road, Mansur Anvari

2012
Top winner: (no winner)
Literary criticism: Rumi-Like on the Silent Secrets by Ali Mohammadi Asiabadi and Crimson Wisdom by Taqi Purnamdarian
Memoir: Noureddin, Son of Iran by Masumeh Sepehri
Biography: The Biography entitled 'Alef-Laam Khomeini by Hedayatollah Behbudi Kalhori 
Fiction: Hafez Seven by Akbar Sahraei2013 No winner in any categories. However, works were said to be "praiseworthy" for Mahmoud Fotouhi, Sohrab Yazdani, Safaoding Tabraeian and Amir Razagh Zadeh.20142015 No works in the categories of short story, literary criticism, or documentation were "deemed worthy". 
 Novel: Fall Is the Last Season by Nasim Marashi and The Well-Behaved Girl by Shahriar Abbasi shared the Novel prize.2016Each winner received 10 Bahar Azadi gold coins.
 Novel: Barren by Mohammadreza Bairami2017 Novel: TBD2018'
 Novel:  رهش ("Salvation") by Reza Amirkhani

See also

 List of history awards

References

Iranian literary awards
Awards established in 2008
Fiction awards
History awards
Iran Book House